Squids Will Be Squids is a children's picture book written by Jon Scieszka and illustrated by Lane Smith.  It was published in 1998 by Viking Press.

Reception
Roger Sutton, of Horn Book Magazine, reviewed the book saying, "The humor is definitely juvenile and wears a little thin, but Scieszka has perfect pitch when it comes to this kind of thing ("Moral: He who smelt it, dealt it"), and Smith's portraits find the humanity behind the masks".

References

American picture books
Children's fiction books
1998 children's books
Fables